Wang Yang may refer to:

People 
Wang Yang (politician) (born 1955), Chairman of the National Committee of the Chinese People's Political Consultative Conference
Wang Yang (Liaoning politician) (born 1957), former provincial official from Liaoning
Wang Yang (general) (汪洋; 1920–2001), Chinese general and government minister

Sportspeople
Wang Yang (water polo) (born 1983), Chinese water polo player 
Wang Yang (footballer, born 1982), Chinese football player best known for his career at Jiangsu Sainty
Wang Yang (footballer, born 1989), Chinese football player who currently plays for Hebei Zhongji
Wang Yang (footballer, born 1991), Chinese football player
Wang Yang (footballer, born 1993), Chinese football player who currently plays for Hangzhou Greentown
Wang Yang (table tennis) (born 1994), Slovak table tennis player
Jimmy Wang Yang (born 1981), American-born Korean wrestler
Yang Wang (sport shooter) (born 1976), New Zealand sport shooter
Wang Yang (sailor), Chinese sailor
Wang Yang (wheelchair racer), Paralympic wheelchair racer

Places 
Wang Yang District, Nakhon Phanom Province, Thailand
Wang Yang, Phitsanulok, Thailand
Wangyang, Huilong, a village in Huilong, Hanchuan, Xiaogan, Hubei, China

See also
 Wang Yan (disambiguation)